Conus stanfieldi is a species of sea snail, a marine gastropod mollusk in the family Conidae, the cone snails, cone shells or cones.

These snails are predatory and venomous. They are capable of "stinging" humans.

Description
The size of the shell attains 33 mm.

Distribution
This marine species occurs off the Bahamas.

References

 Petuch, E. J. 1993b. Molluscan Discoveries from the tropical western Atlantic region. Part II. A new species of Leporiconus Iredale, 1930 from the San Blas Islands, Panama. La Conchiglia 25(266):57-59, 5 figs.
 Puillandre N., Duda T.F., Meyer C., Olivera B.M. & Bouchet P. (2015). One, four or 100 genera? A new classification of the cone snails. Journal of Molluscan Studies. 81: 1-23

External links
 To World Register of Marine Species
 

stanfieldi
Gastropods described in 1998